Khadak may refer to:

 Khadak (2006 film), Belgian/Dutch/German film directed by Peter Brosens
 Khadak (2022 film), an Indian Kannada-language crime action film
 Khadak, Nepal, municipality in Saptari District, Province No. 2, Nepal
 Khadak Malegaon, village in Nashik, Maharashtra, India

See also
 Katar Khadak, a village in Mulshi taluka, Pune District, Maharashtra, India